Charles Albert Plumley (April 14, 1875 – October 31, 1964) was an American lawyer and politician. He served as a Republican U.S. Representative from Vermont, and was the son of U.S. Representative Frank Plumley.

Biography
Plumley was born in Northfield, Washington County, Vermont to Frank Plumley and Lavinia Fletcher Plumley. He attended Northfield High School. In 1896 he graduated from Norwich University in Northfield, Vermont with a Bachelor of Arts, and he received his Master of Arts degree from Norwich in 1899.  Plumley also received several honorary degrees, including an LL.D. (1921) and Doctor of Letters (1947) from Norwich, and LL.D. degrees from Middlebury College (1922), Boston University (1940), and the University of Vermont (1941).

Plumley served as an assistant secretary of the Vermont State Senate in 1894. He was principal and superintendent of the Northfield grade school and Northfield High School from 1896 to 1900. He was a captain in the Vermont National Guard in 1901, and a colonel in the Officers’ Reserve Corps.

He studied law and was admitted to the bar in 1903; beginning the practice of law in Nortfield. He served as Secretary of the French-Venezuela Mixed Commission in 1906. He was a member of the Vermont House of Representatives from 1912 to 1915, serving as Speaker of the Vermont House of Representatives from 1912 to 1915 and as Commissioner of Taxes for the State of Vermont from 1912 to 1919.

Plumley was general counsel and tax attorney for a rubber company in Akron, Ohio from 1919 to 1920. He then practiced law in partnership with his father and Murdock A. Campbell.  He also served as president of Norwich University from 1920 to 1934, and as reading clerk of the Republican National Conventions in 1936 and 1940. He was also involved in the banking industry.

In 1934 Plumley was elected as a Republican to the Seventy-third Congress to fill the vacancy caused by the resignation of Ernest W. Gibson. Plumley was reelected to the Seventy-fourth and to the seven succeeding Congresses, serving from January 16, 1934 to January 3, 1951 as U.S. Representative from Vermont (at-large). He was not a candidate for renomination in 1950. After leaving Congress, he resumed the practice of law in Northfield, Vermont.

Family life
Plumley was married to Emilie Adele Stevens Plumley in 1900 and they had three children together, Allan R. Plumley, Fletcher D. P. Plumley (named for Governor Fletcher Dutton Proctor) and Evelyn Stevens Plumley Adams. Plumley's father was U.S. Representative Frank Plumley.

Death and legacy
Plumley died on October 31, 1964 in Barre, Vermont. He is interred at Mount Hope Cemetery in Northfield, Vermont.

Plumley Armory on the campus of Norwich University was named after Plumley in 1962. The armory houses military and athletic facilities, and was built in 1929.

References

Further reading
 "Biennial Report of the Attorney General of the State of Vermont", by the Vermont Attorney General's Office, 1916.

External links
 

The Political Graveyard
Norwich University website
Norwich University Archives & Special Collections:Charles Albert Plumley Papers, 1863, 1890-1965 (2 Boxes)

Norwich University: Building Information
govtrack.us

1875 births
1964 deaths
Vermont National Guard personnel
Vermont lawyers
Republican Party members of the Vermont House of Representatives
Speakers of the Vermont House of Representatives
Norwich University alumni
Republican Party members of the United States House of Representatives from Vermont
Norwich University faculty
Presidents of Norwich University